Scoparia brevituba is a moth in the family Crambidae. It was described by Wei-Chun Li, Hou-Hun Li and Matthias Nuss in 2010. It is found in Sichuan, China.

The length of the forewings is 8–10 mm. The forewings are suffused with blackish-brown scales. The antemedian, postmedian and subterminal lines are white. The hindwings are white, but pale brown before the termen.

Etymology
The species name refers to the distinctively short ductus bursae in the female genitalia and is derived from Latin brevitubus (meaning short tubal).

References

Moths described in 2010
Scopariinae